Bahrain Cycling Academy is a Bahraini UCI Continental cycling team founded in 2017. The team support the next generation of Bahrain cyclists, in order to improve them to the world top level.

Team roster

Major results
2018
Stage 3 Tour d'Algérie, Axel Costa
Stage 6 Tour d'Algérie, Ali Nouisri

References

External links

UCI Continental Teams (Asia)
Cycling teams established in 2017
Cycling teams based in Bahrain